Led Zeppelin, sometimes referred to as Led Zeppelin I, is the debut studio album by English rock band Led Zeppelin. It was released on 12 January 1969 in the United States and on 31 March in the United Kingdom by Atlantic Records.

The album was recorded in September and October 1968 at Olympic Studios in London, shortly after the band's formation. It contains a mix of original material worked out in the first rehearsals, and remakes and rearrangements of contemporary blues and folk songs. The sessions took place before the group had secured a recording contract and totalled 36 hours; they were paid for directly by Jimmy Page, the group's founder, leader and guitarist, and Led Zeppelin's manager Peter Grant and cost £1,782 to complete. They were produced by Page, who as a musician was joined by band members Robert Plant (lead vocals, harmonica), John Paul Jones (bass, keyboards), and John Bonham (drums). Percussionist Viram Jasani appears as a guest on one track. The tracks were mixed by Page's childhood friend Glyn Johns, and the iconic album cover showing the Hindenburg disaster was designed by George Hardie.

Led Zeppelin showed the group's fusion of blues and rock, and their take on the emerging hard rock sound was immediately commercially successful in both the UK and US, reaching the top 10 on album charts in both countries, as well as several others. Many of the songs were longer and not well suited to be released as singles for radio airplay; Page was reluctant to release "singles", so only "Good Times Bad Times", backed with "Communication Breakdown", was released outside of the UK. However, due to exposure on album-oriented rock radio stations, and growth in popularity of the band, many of the album's songs have become classic rock radio staples.

Background
In July 1968, the English rock band the Yardbirds disbanded after two founder members Keith Relf and Jim McCarty quit the group, with a third, Chris Dreja, leaving to become a photographer shortly afterwards. The fourth member, guitarist Jimmy Page, was left with rights to the name and contractual obligations for a series of concerts in Scandinavia. Page asked seasoned session player and arranger John Paul Jones to join as bassist, and hoped to recruit Terry Reid as singer and Procol Harum's B. J. Wilson as drummer. Wilson was still committed to Procol Harum, and Reid declined to join but recommended Robert Plant, who met with Page at his boathouse in Pangbourne, Berkshire in August to talk about music and work on new material.

Page and Plant realised they had good musical chemistry together, and Plant asked friend and former band-mate John Bonham to drum for the new group. The line-up of Page, Plant, Jones and Bonham first rehearsed on 19 August 1968 (the day before Plant's 20th birthday), shortly before a tour of Scandinavia as "the New Yardbirds", performing some old Yardbirds material as well as new songs such as "Communication Breakdown", "I Can't Quit You Baby", "You Shook Me", "Babe I'm Gonna Leave You" and "How Many More Times". After they returned to London following the tour, Page changed the band's name to Led Zeppelin, and the group entered Olympic Studios at 11 p.m. on 25 September 1968 to record their debut album.

Recording 
Page said that the album took only about 36 hours of studio time (over a span of a few weeks) to create (including mixing), adding that he knew this because of the amount charged on the studio bill. One of the primary reasons for the short recording time was that the material selected for the album had been well-rehearsed and pre-arranged by the band on the Scandinavian tour.

The band had not yet signed a deal, and there was no record company money to waste on excessive studio time. Page and Led Zeppelin's manager Peter Grant paid for the sessions themselves. The reported total studio costs were £1,782. The self-funding was important because it meant they could record exactly what they wanted without record company interference.

For the recordings Page played a psychedelically painted Fender Telecaster – a gift from friend Jeff Beck after Page recommended him to join the Yardbirds in 1965, replacing Eric Clapton on lead guitar. Page played the Telecaster through a Supro amplifier, and used a Gibson J-200 for the album's acoustic tracks. For "Your Time Is Gonna Come" he used a Fender 10-string pedal steel guitar.

Production 
Led Zeppelin was produced by Page and engineered by Glyn Johns, who had known each other since they were teenagers in the suburb of Epsom. According to Page, most of the album was recorded live, with overdubs added later.

Page used a "distance makes depth" approach to production. He used natural room ambience to enhance the reverb and recording texture on the record, demonstrating the innovations in sound recording he had learned during his session days. At the time, most music producers placed microphones directly in front of the amplifiers and drums. For Led Zeppelin, Page developed the idea of placing an additional microphone some distance from the amplifier (as far as ) and then recording the balance between the two. Page became one of the first producers to record a band's "ambient sound": the distance of a note's time-lag from one end of the room to the other.

Because of the live recording, some songs had Plant's vocals bleed onto other tracks. Page later stated that this was a natural product of Plant's powerful voice, but added the leakage "sounds intentional". On "You Shook Me", Page used the "reverse echo" technique. It involves hearing the echo before the main sound (instead of after it), and is achieved by turning the tape over and recording the echo on a spare track, then turning the tape back over again to get the echo preceding the signal.

This was one of the first albums to be released in stereo only. Prior to this, albums had been released in separate mono and stereo versions.

Composition

The songs on Led Zeppelin came from the first group rehearsals, which were then refined on the Scandinavian tour. The group were familiar with the material when they entered Olympic to start recording, a reason the album was completed quickly. Plant participated in songwriting but was not given credit because of unexpired contractual obligations to CBS Records. He was retroactively given credit on "Good Times, Bad Times", "Your Time Is Gonna Come", "Communication Breakdown", "Babe I'm Gonna Leave You", and "How Many More Times".

Side one
"Good Times Bad Times" was a commercial-sounding track that was considered as the group's debut single in the UK, and released as such in the US. As well as showcasing the whole band and their new heavy style, it featured a catchy chorus and a variety of guitar overdubs. Despite being a strong track, it was seldom performed live by Led Zeppelin. One of the few occasions it was played was the Ahmet Ertegun Tribute Concert in 2007.

"Babe I'm Gonna Leave You" was a re-arrangement of a song composed by Anne Bredon in the 1950s. Page had heard the song recorded by Joan Baez for her 1962 album Joan Baez in Concert. It was one of the first numbers that he worked on with Plant when the two first met at Pangbourne in August 1968. Page played both the Gibson J-200 acoustic and Telecaster on the track. Plant originally sang the song in a heavier style, similar to other performances on the album, but was persuaded by Page to re-record it to allow some light and shade on the track.

"You Shook Me" was a blues song with lyrics by Willie Dixon and fitted in with the British blues boom that was ongoing when the album was being recorded. Jones, Plant and Page took solos on Hammond organ, harmonica and guitar respectively. Page put backwards echo on the track, which was then a novel production device, on the call and response between the vocal and guitar towards the end. The song had been recorded by Jeff Beck for the album Truth (1968) and Beck subsequently said he was unhappy about Led Zeppelin copying his arrangement.

"Dazed and Confused" was written and recorded by Jake Holmes in 1967. The original album credited Page as the sole composer; Holmes sued for copyright infringement in 2010 and an out-of-court settlement was reached the following year. The Yardbirds performed the song regularly in concert during 1968, including several radio and television sessions. Their arrangement included a section where Page played the guitar with a violin bow, an idea suggested by David McCallum Sr. whom Page had met while doing sessions. Page also used the guitar solo for one of the last Yardbirds recordings, "Think About It". Led Zeppelin's adaptations of "Dazed and Confused" used some different lyrics, while Jones and Bonham developed the arrangement to accommodate their playing styles.

The song was an important part of Led Zeppelin's live show throughout their early career, and became a vehicle for group improvisation, eventually stretching in length to over 30minutes. The improvisation would sometimes include parts of another song, including the group's "The Crunge" and "Walter's Walk" (released later on Houses of the Holy and Coda, respectively), Joni Mitchell's "Woodstock" and Scott McKenzie's "San Francisco (Be Sure to Wear Flowers in Your Hair)". It was briefly dropped from the live set in 1975 after Page injured a finger, but was re-instated for the remainder of the tour. The last full live performance during Led Zeppelin's main career was at Earl's Court in London later that year, after which the violin bow section of the song's guitar solo was played as a standalone piece. It was revived as a complete song performance for the Ahmet Ertegun Tribute Concert in 2007.

Side two
"Your Time Is Gonna Come" opens with Jones playing an unaccompanied organ solo, leading into the verse. Page plays acoustic and pedal steel guitar. The track has a crossfade into "Black Mountain Side", an acoustic instrumental based on Bert Jansch's arrangement of the traditional folk song "Black Water Side" and influenced by the folk playing of Jansch and John Renbourn. The song was regularly performed live as a medley with the Yardbirds solo guitar number "White Summer".

"Communication Breakdown" was built around a Page guitar riff, and one of the first tunes the group worked on. They enjoyed playing it live, and consequently it was a regular part of their set. It was played intermittently throughout the group's career, often as an encore.

"I Can't Quit You Baby" was another Willie Dixon-penned blues number. It was recorded live in the studio, and arranged in a slower and more laid-back style compared to some of the other material on the album.

"How Many More Times" was the group's closing live number in their early career. The song was improvised around an old Howlin' Wolf number, "How Many More Years", and a Page guitar riff, which developed spontaneously into a jam session. The track includes a bolero section similar to Jeff Beck's "Beck's Bolero" (which was written by and featured Page), and segues into "Rosie" and "The Hunter" which were improvised during recording. Page played the guitar with the violin bow in the middle section of the track, similar to "Dazed and Confused".

Unreleased material
Two other songs from the Olympic sessions, "Baby Come On Home" and "Sugar Mama", were left off the album. They were released on the 2015 reissue of the retrospective album Coda.

Artwork

Led Zeppelins front cover, which was chosen by Page, features a black-and-white image of the burning Hindenburg airship, photographed by Sam Shere on 6 May 1937, during the Hindenburg disaster. The image refers to the origin of the band's name itself: When Page, Beck and The Who's Keith Moon and John Entwistle were discussing the idea of forming a group, Moon joked, "It would probably go over like a lead balloon", and Entwistle reportedly replied, "a lead zeppelin!"

The back cover features a photograph of the band taken by Dreja. The entire design of the album's sleeve was coordinated by George Hardie, with whom the band would continue to collaborate for future sleeves. Hardie himself also created the front cover illustration, rendering the famous original black-and-white photograph in ink using a Rapidograph technical pen and a mezzotint technique.

Hardie recalled that he originally offered the band a design based on an old club sign in San Franciscoa multi-sequential image of a zeppelin airship up in the clouds. Page declined but it was retained as the logo for the back cover of Led Zeppelin's first two albums and a number of early press advertisements. The first UK pressing featured the band name and the Atlantic logo in turquoise. When it was switched to the orange print later that year, the turquoise-printed sleeve became a collector's item.

The album cover gained further widespread attention when, at a February 1970 gig in Copenhagen, the band were billed as "the Nobs" as the result of a legal threat from aristocrat Eva von Zeppelin (a relative of the creator of the Zeppelin aircraft). Von Zeppelin, upon seeing the logo of the Hindenburg crashing in flames, threatened legal action over the concert taking place. In 2001, Greg Kot wrote in Rolling Stone that "The cover of Led Zeppelin… shows the Hindenburg airship, in all its phallic glory, going down in flames. The image did a pretty good job of encapsulating the music inside: sex, catastrophe and things blowing up."

Critical reception
The album was advertised in selected music papers under the slogan "Led Zeppelinthe only way to fly". It initially received poor reviews. In a stinging assessment, Rolling Stone magazine asserted that the band offered "little that its twin, the Jeff Beck Group, didn't say as well or better three months ago… to fill the void created by the demise of Cream, they will have to find a producer, editor and some material worthy of their collective talents", calling Page a "limited producer" and criticizing his writing skills. It also called Plant "as foppish as Rod Stewart, but nowhere near so exciting". Because of the bad press, Led Zeppelin avoided talking to them throughout their career. Eventually, their reputation as a good live band recovered by word-of-mouth.

Rock journalist Cameron Crowe noted years later: "It was a time of 'super-groups', of furiously hyped bands who could barely cut it, and Led Zeppelin initially found themselves fighting upstream to prove their authenticity." Despite shaky press the album is now considered by some of their fans to be one of the group's best albums.

However, press reaction to the album was not entirely negative. In Britain the album received a glowing review in Melody Maker. Chris Welch wrote, in a review titled "Jimmy Page triumphsLed Zeppelin is a gas!": "their material does not rely on obvious blues riffs, although when they do play them, they avoid the emaciated feebleness of most so-called British blues bands". In Oz, Felix Dennis regarded it as one of those rare albums that "defies immediate classification or description, simply because it's so obviously a turning point in rock music that only time proves capable of shifting it into eventual perspective". In comparing the record to their follow-up Led Zeppelin II, Robert Christgau wrote in The Village Voice that the debut was "subtler and more ambitious musically", and not as good, "because subtlety defeated the effect. Musicianship, in other words, was really incidental to such music, but the music did have real strength and validity: a combination of showmanship and overwhelming physical force."

The album was a commercial success. It was initially released in the US on 12 January 1969 to capitalise on the band's first North American concert tour. Before that, Atlantic Records had distributed a few hundred advance white label copies to key radio stations and reviewers. A positive reaction to its contents, coupled with a good reaction to the band's opening concerts, resulted in the album generating 50,000 advance orders. The album reached number 10 on the Billboard chart. The album earned its US gold certification in July 1969.

Legacy

The album's success and influence is widely acknowledged, even by publications that were initially sceptical. In 2006, Rolling Stone commented on the originality of the music, and Zeppelin's heavy style, comparing them to Cream, Jimi Hendrix, the MC5 and the Stooges, but reiterated that they had mass appeal. Led Zeppelin was cited by Stephen Thomas Erlewine as "a significant turning point in the evolution of hard rock and heavy metal". According to arts and culture scholar Michael Fallon, it "announced the emergence of a loud and raw new musical genre" in metal. and by the BBC as "a product of the 1960s whose often bombastic style signposted a new decade". Sheldon Pearce from Consequence of Sound regarded it as Zeppelin's "ode to rock's progressive metamorphosis" and "the first hard rock domino" for their future accomplishments: "Its orchestration delves adventurously through hard rock and heavy metal with bluesy undertones that often cause the chords to weep poignantly as if struck with malice".

The album was described as a "brilliant if heavy-handed blues-rock offensive" by popular music scholar Ronald Zalkind. Martin Popoff argued that while the album may not have been the first heavy metal record, it did feature what was likely to be the first metal song – "Communication Breakdown""with its no-nonsense machine gun between the numbers riff". In 2003, VH1 named Led Zeppelin the 44th-greatest album of all time. The same year, the album was ranked 29th on Rolling Stones 500 Greatest Albums of All Time (their highest charting album on the list); an accompanying blurb read: "Heavy metal still lives in its shadow," maintaining the rating in a 2012 revised list, and ranked 101st in a 2020 revised list.  In 2004, the album was inducted into the Grammy Hall of Fame. Jimmy Page, observed Aerosmith's Joe Perry, "was an incredible producer and he wrote all these great songs. When he was cutting the first Zeppelin album, he knew what he wanted. His vision was so much more global than Jeff and Eric's. Playing guitar was just one part of the puzzle… I have to have the first four Led Zeppelin albums on me at all times."

2014 reissue

Along with the group's next two albums – Led Zeppelin II and Led Zeppelin III – the album was remastered and reissued in June 2014. The reissue comes in six formats: a standard CD edition, a deluxe two-CD edition, a standard LP version, a deluxe three-LP version, a super deluxe two-CD-plus-three-LP version with a hardback book, and as high-resolution, 24-bit/96k digital downloads. The deluxe and super-deluxe editions feature bonus material from a concert at the Olympia in Paris, recorded in October 1969, previously available only in bootleg forms. The reissue was released with an inverted black and white version of the original album's artwork as its bonus disc's cover.

The reissue was met with widespread critical acclaim. At Metacritic, which assigns a normalised rating out of 100 to reviews from mainstream publications, the album received an average score of 97, based on 10 reviews. Q deemed it an improvement over previous remasters of the album and credited Page's contribution to the remaster for revealing more detail. Erlewine found the bonus disc "particularly exciting" in his review for AllMusic, writing that "it's not tight but that's its appeal, as it shows how the band was a vital, living beast, playing differently on-stage than they did in the studio." According to Paste magazine's Ryan Reed, "for years, Zep-heads have tolerated the murky fidelity of the '90s remasters" until the reissue, which "finally punches and shimmers instead of fizzling in fuzz". He was critical of the bonus disc, however, believing it "remains inessential—the very definition of 'for completists only.'... [It] demonstrates Zeppelin at their most bloated, sloppily fumbling through rhythmic cues and extending tracks to their breaking point".

Track listing

Original release

Deluxe edition (2014)

Personnel
Taken from the sleeve notes.

Led Zeppelin
Robert Plant – lead vocal, harmonica 
Jimmy Page – electric, acoustic and pedal steel guitars, backing vocal, production
John Paul Jones – bass, organ, backing vocal
John Bonham – drums, timpani, backing vocal

Additional musician
Viram Jasani – tabla on "Black Mountain Side"

Production
Chris Dreja – back cover photography
Peter Grant – executive production
George Hardie – cover design
Glyn Johns – engineering, mixing
George Marino – CD remastering
John Davis – 2014 reissue remastering

Charts 
Weekly charts

Certifications

Notes

References

Sources

External links
 
 

1969 debut albums
Led Zeppelin albums
Atlantic Records albums
Albums produced by Jimmy Page
Albums recorded at Olympic Sound Studios
Polydor Records albums
Warner Music Group albums
Grammy Hall of Fame Award recipients
LZ 129 Hindenburg